Mucoprotective agents are pharmaceutical or herbal medicines that protect mucous membrane tissues. They include such things as demulcents.

References

External links 

 DRUG PROFILE OF NOVAL ANTIULCER AND MUCOPROTECTIVE DRUG

Herbalism